The 2017–18 World Rugby Sevens Series, known for sponsorship reasons as the HSBC World Rugby Sevens Series, was  the 19th annual series of rugby sevens tournaments for national men's rugby sevens teams. The Sevens Series has been run by World Rugby since 1999–2000.

Core teams

Tour venues
The official schedule for the 2017–18 World Rugby Sevens Series is:

There were several significant changes to the schedule:
 The New Zealand event moved from Wellington, which had hosted an event in every previous season of the series, to Hamilton.
 The Australia and New Zealand events will swap places in the tournament order.
 The schedule includes a break for the 2018 Commonwealth Games, which will hold its sevens tournament on 14–15 April at Gold Coast.
 The Paris and London Sevens, which swapped places in the season order, will take place several weeks later than usual in order to provide more rest for players, many of whom will have been involved in the Commonwealth Games.

Standings

Official standings for the 2017–18 series:

Source: World Rugby. Archived 

{| class="wikitable" style="font-size:92%;"
|-
!colspan=2| Legend 
|-
|No colour
|Core team in 2017–18 and re-qualified as a core team for the 2018–19 World Rugby Sevens Series
|-
|bgcolor=#fcc|Pink
|Relegated as the lowest placed core team at the end of the 2017–18 season
|-
|bgcolor=#ffc|Yellow
|Not a core team
|}

Placings summary
Tallies of top four tournament placings during the 2017–18 series, by team:

Players

Scoring leaders

Updated: 10 June 2018

Updated: 10 June 2018

Awards

Updated: 5 June 2018

Updated: 5 June 2018

Tournaments

Dubai

Cape Town

Sydney

Hamilton

Las Vegas

Vancouver

Hong Kong

Singapore

London

Paris

See also

 2017–18 World Rugby Women's Sevens Series

References

External links
Official Site

 
World Rugby Sevens Series